Civil Administration of the Eastern Lands was a civil authority of the territories controlled by Second Polish Republic but not incorporated into the state itself, that was formed during the Polish–Soviet War in 1919 and existed until 1920. It was formed on 19 February 1919 from the territories taken by Poland during the war, that were previously occupied by the Russian SFSR. In the summer of 1920, forces of Russian SFSR had conquered the area. After part of the area was reconquered by Poland, the administration was formally disestablished on 9 September 1920, and replaced by the Provisional Administration of Front-line and Phase Territories.

History 
Civil Administration of the Eastern Lands was established by Second Polish Republic on 19 February 1919, during the Polish–Soviet War, as a civil authority of the territories controlled but not incorporated into the state itself. It was formed from the territories taken by Poland during the war, that were previously occupied by the Russian SFSR. It was established by the decision of the Commander-in-chief of the Polish Armed Forces, and was placed under the rule of Chief Commissioner. On 22 April 1920, after the Vilna offensive, and taking control of Vilnius by Poland, Józef Piłsudski, had made a speech, known as Proclamation to the inhabitants of the former Grand Duchy of Lithuania, in which he had announced that the conquered territories would be placed under a civil administration rather than a military one.

On 17 February 1920, the Volhynian District together with neighboring lands, that would later form Podolian District, were transferred to the newly formed Civil Administration of the Lands of Volhynia and Podolian Front. On 1 June 1920, with the decision of the Commander-in-chief of the Polish Armed Forces, the administration was placed under the direct control Council of Ministers of Poland.

In the summer of 1920, forces of Russian SFSR had conquered the area. After part of the area was reconquered by Poland, the administration was formally disestablished on 9 September 1920, and replaced by the Provisional Administration of Front-line and Phase Territories.

Subdivisions 
The administration was subdevided into 4 districts that were: Brześć District, Mińsk District, Wilno District and Volhynian District.

On 17 February 1920, the Volhynian District together with neighboring lands, that would later form Podolian District, were transferred to the newly formed Civil Administration of the Lands of Volhynia and Podolian Front.

List of Chief Commissioners 
 Ludwik Kolankowski (19 February 1919 – 15 April 1919)
 Jerzy Osmołowski (15 April 1919 – 1920)

Notes

References

Bibliography 
 Waldemar Kozyra, Polityka administracyjna władz polskich na Ziemiach Wschodnich Rzeczypospolitej Polskiej w latach 1918–1926, Białystok 2005
 Joanna Gierowska-Kałłaur, Zarząd Cywilny Ziem Wschodnich, Warszawa 2003 s. 447 + ilustr.
 Adam Janusz Mielcarek, Podziały terytorialno-administracyjne II Rzeczypospolitej w zakresie administracji zespolonej, Warszawa 2008
 Adam Janusz Mielcarek,  Węzłowe zagadnienia ustrojowe Zarządu Cywilnego Ziem Wschodnich (1919-1920), w świetle aktów normatywnych, w: „Studia z Dziejów Państwa i Prawa Polskiego”, Kraków – Lublin – Łódź 2011, T. 14, s. 241–251.
 Dziennik Urzędowy Zarządu Cywilnego Ziem Wschodnich
 Norman Davies. White Eagle, Red Star: the Polish Soviet War, 1919-20. London: Pimlico. 1972. ISBN 0-7126-0694-7.

Civil administrations of the Second Polish Republic
Western Belorussia (1918–1939)
History of Volhynia
History of Podolia
History of Vilnius
History of Minsk
Polish–Soviet War
States and territories established in 1919
States and territories disestablished in 1920
1919 establishments in Poland
1919 establishments in Belarus
1919 establishments in Ukraine
1919 disestablishments in Poland
1920 disestablishments in Lithuania
1920 disestablishments in Ukraine